Plain Rap is the third studio album by Los Angeles hip hop group The Pharcyde. The album was released on November 7, 2000, on Delicious Vinyl/Edel America Records. Slimkid3 (Tre Hardson) left the group after the release of the album.

The album peaked at #157 on the Billboard 200.

Production
The album contains production from Showbiz of D.I.T.C., J-Swift, and the group themselves. It features lone guest Black Thought.

Critical reception
The Los Angeles Times called the album "uninspired," writing that the group "deliver their lyrics without much of the inflection and flair that made the group’s earlier material memorable." The A.V. Club wrote that "too often ... Plain Rap sounds like what Labcabin'''s detractors unfairly accused it of being: mature and adult to the point of sounding hopelessly dull." Portland Mercury'' wrote that "it's not that the album is horrible--it just isn't going anywhere."

Robert Christgau listed "Trust" as a "choice cut."

Track listing
 "Trust" 4:42
 "Network (feat. Black Thought)" 5:08
 "LA" 3:24   
 "Somethin'" 4:52
 "Misery" 5:10
 "Blaze"  3:33
 "Rush"   3:12
 "Sock Skit" 1:18
 "Guestlist" 3:51
 "Evolution" 4:02
 "Front Line 5:08
 "World"     5:48
 "Trust (Remix)" 4:51

Singles

References

2000 albums
The Pharcyde albums
Albums produced by Showbiz (producer)